Tartarlar may refer to:
Tatars
Tatalılar, Azerbaijan